The 2014 North Dakota State Bison football team represented North Dakota State University in the 2014 NCAA Division I FCS football season. They were led by first year head coach Chris Klieman. The team played their 22nd season in the Fargodome. The Bison have been members of the Missouri Valley Football Conference since the 2008 season.

The Bison ended the season by winning their fourth consecutive NCAA Division I Football Championship, beating Illinois State 29–27 in the National Championship Game. North Dakota State became the first NCAA Division I football team to win four straight NCAA titles and the second of any NCAA division to win four straight.  The other four time championship team was the Augustana College Vikings, the Division III champions in the 1983–1986 seasons. The season did however see the Bison's 33 game winning streak come to an end against the UNI Panthers on the road. That streak was the longest in FCS history and the 3rd longest over the last 50 years in all NCAA football history.

Schedule

 Source: Schedule

Coaching staff

Game summaries

at Iowa State

at Weber State

Incarnate Word

Montana

at Western Illinois

Southern Illinois

Indiana State

at South Dakota

South Dakota State

at Northern Iowa

at Missouri State

Youngstown State

FCS Playoffs

Second Round–South Dakota State

Quarterfinal–Coastal Carolina

Semifinal–Sam Houston State

Championship–Illinois State

2015 NFL draft

Ranking movements

References

North Dakota State
North Dakota State Bison football seasons
NCAA Division I Football Champions
Missouri Valley Football Conference champion seasons
North Dakota State
North Dakota State Bison football